Jeffrey P. Victory (born January 29, 1946) is a former associate justice of the Louisiana Supreme Court.

Life and career 
Victory was born in Shreveport, Louisiana. He attended Centenary College of Louisiana and Tulane University Law School.

Victory was an associate justice of the Louisiana Supreme Court from 1995 to 2014.

References 

1946 births
Living people
People from Shreveport, Louisiana
Louisiana Democrats
Louisiana Republicans
Justices of the Louisiana Supreme Court
20th-century American judges
21st-century American judges
Centenary College of Louisiana alumni
Tulane University Law School alumni